Salem is an unincorporated community in Taylor County, Florida, United States. Salem has a post office with ZIP code 32356, which opened on April 16, 1915.

References

Unincorporated communities in Taylor County, Florida